Monoxenus elevatus is a species of beetle in the family Cerambycidae. It was described by Per Olof Christopher Aurivillius in 1926 and is known from Uganda.

References

Endemic fauna of Uganda
elevatus
Beetles described in 1926